Stowbtsy or Stolbtsy is a town in Minsk Region, Belarus, and the administrative center of Stowbtsy District. It is located on the Neman River. The population is approximately 15,400.

Name origin
"Stowbtsy" means "columns" or "posts" in Belarusian. A suggested version for the name origin: once the Neman River was very deep, and sailing boats had to be tied to wooden posts to secure the boats against a strong flow of the river.

History
The city was founded in 1593. For a long time it was a shtetl with significant Jewish population.

In August 1924, while Stowbtsy was part of the Second Polish Republic, the town was the site of a Soviet-Polish border incident in which a company of Soviet raiders attacked its police station and government building in order to free two imprisoned communist activists (see Soviet raid on Stołpce).

In June 1941, there were more than 3,000 Jews living in the town, including several hundred refugees from the German occupied parts of Poland. The city was under German occupation from 1941 to 1944. After a week of occupation, the Germans shot around 200 Jews together with several dozen non- Jews, allegedly as a reprisal for sniper fire directed at German soldiers. On September 23, 1942, some 450 Jews were sent to their workplaces, and 750 Jews, most of them women, were shot in a forest, while another 850 either managed to flee or remained in hiding in the ghetto. On October 2, another 488 Jews, composed mostly of women and children were shot.  Another 350 Jews were killed on October 11. On January 31, 1943, the remaining 254 Jews, including those brought in from Novy Sverzhen, were shot. In the following days, the captured Jews were also shot and 293 Jews had been shot by February 4, 1943. Some of the Jews who fled the ghetto survived by joining the Bielski partisans in the nearby Naliboki Forest.

Notable residents 
 Jakub Kolas (1882, Akinčycy village (now part of Stowbtsy) – 1956), Belarusian writer and poet 
 Ivonka Survilla (b.1936), current President of the Rada of the Belarusian Democratic Republic

Notes

Bibliography 
.

External links 

Verchniaye Paniamonnie: Almanac of local history
Photos on Radzima.org
https://stolbtsy.by/o-gorode.htm

Populated places established in the 16th century
Towns in Belarus
Populated places in Minsk Region
Stowbtsy District
Minsk Voivodeship
Minsky Uyezd
Nowogródek Voivodeship (1919–1939)
Holocaust locations in Belarus